Evergestis hordealis is a species of moth in the family Crambidae. It is found in North Africa.

The wingspan is 27–28 mm. Adults have been recorded on wing in September.

References

Moths described in 1915
Evergestis
Moths of Africa